Timora albisticta is a species of moth of the family Noctuidae first described by Anthonie Johannes Theodorus Janse in 1917. It is found in Africa, including South Africa.

External links
 

Endemic moths of South Africa
Heliothinae